is a species of bacteria in the genus Clostridium.

References 

carnis